Mount Rees can refer to:
 Mount Rees (Victoria Land)
 Mount Rees (Marie Byrd Land)